Igor Zaytsev (born June 16, 1984) is a Russian film director, screenwriter and actor.

Biography 
Igor was born on March 14, 1961, in the town of Krasny Luch. He studied at the Rostov College of Arts by specialty theater actor and at the Boris Shchukin Theatre Institute by specialty drama director.

Filmography (selected)
 High Security Vacation (2009)
 Bender: The Beginning (2021)
 Bender: Gold of the Empire (2021)

References

External links 
 
 Igor Zaytsev on kino-teatr.ru

Living people
Russian film directors
1961 births